Yuliya Anatoliyivna Tkach, née Ostapchuk, (also transliterated Iulia, born 26 September 1989 in Kovel) is a Ukrainian freestyle wrestler. She is a member of Dynamo sports club.  World champion in 2014, she competed for Ukraine at the 2008, 2012 and 2016 Summer Olympics.

Career
At the 2008 Summer Olympics, she lost to Randi Miller in her first match.

Tkach competed in the freestyle 63 kg event at the 2012 Summer Olympics; she defeated Yelena Shalygina in the quarterfinals and Marianna Sastin in the 1/8 finals before being eliminated by Lubov Volosova in the quarterfinals.

She returned from a break to start a family to win a bronze medal at the 2014 European Championships before winning the World title later that year.

At the 2016 Olympics, she won her first match Danielle Lappage when Lappage retired injured before losing to Xu Rui in the second round.

References

External links
 
 
 

1989 births
Living people
Ukrainian female sport wrestlers
Olympic wrestlers of Ukraine
Wrestlers at the 2008 Summer Olympics
Wrestlers at the 2012 Summer Olympics
Wrestlers at the 2016 Summer Olympics
People from Kovel
European Games silver medalists for Ukraine
European Games medalists in wrestling
Wrestlers at the 2015 European Games
World Wrestling Championships medalists
European Games gold medalists for Ukraine
Wrestlers at the 2019 European Games
European Wrestling Champions
Sportspeople from Volyn Oblast
21st-century Ukrainian women